Worcestershire County Council is the county council for the non-metropolitan county of Worcestershire in England. The most recent elections to it were in 2021. Worcestershire County Council has its headquarters at County Hall in Worcester, which was also the headquarters for the preceding Hereford and Worcester County Council.

Worcestershire County Council was created in 1889; it was abolished in 1974 and replaced by Hereford and Worcester County Council, and was eventually recreated in 1998. It consists of 57 Councillors elected every four years, and is currently controlled by the Conservative Party.

Governance 

Worcestershire County Council currently operates using a Leader and Cabinet system.

The Council is currently composed of 57 councillors, the majority representing a single-member division. Elections are held every four years; the last in 2021.

Cabinet 
Worcestershire County Council's cabinet is composed of nine Conservative councillors and the Conservative Leader of the council. Cabinet members work closely with the directors and professional officers of the council to ensure the successful implementation of the decisions they make.

References

External links
 Website of the Worcestershire County Council
 Profiles of the 57 Councillors

Local government in Worcestershire
County Council
County councils of England
1889 establishments in England
1998 establishments in England
1974 disestablishments in England
Local education authorities in England
Local authorities in Worcestershire
Major precepting authorities in England
Leader and cabinet executives